Graham's gudgeon, Grahamichthys radiata, is a species of goby of the family Thalasseleotrididae, the only member of the genus Grahamichthys. It is unusual for a goby, in that it lives in loose schools.

Etymology
The generic name is a compound formed from the surname Graham in honour of David H. Graham who wrote A Treasury of New Zealand Fishes  which was published in 1953 and therefore is an allusion to this taxon being endemic to New Zealand and the Greek ichthys meaning "fish".

References

 
 Tony Ayling & Geoffrey Cox, Collins Guide to the Sea Fishes of New Zealand,  (William Collins Publishers Ltd, Auckland, New Zealand 1982) 

Thalasseleotrididae
Endemic marine fish of New Zealand
Taxa named by Achille Valenciennes